Hannes Schäfer (born 2 October 1965 in Göttingen, Germany) is a German bass guitarist, a singer and a physician.

He was a founding member of the German rock band Fury in the Slaughterhouse. After his musical career (1996) Schäfer studied medicine. Today (2011), he is a gynaecologist working in his surgery in Hanover, Germany.

Schäfers first band in 1982 was the Hanoverian punk band Defekt, where he was bass guitarist and singer. From 1985 until 1987, he played in a jazz rock band called CIT, featuring Mousse T. During this time Schäfer also worked as a studio musician at Stakkato Studio Hannover.

In 1987, Schäfer founded the rock band Fury in the Slaughterhouse together with Thorsten Wingenfelder, Kai Wingenfelder, Rainer Schumann und Christoph Stein-Schneider in Hanover. He played there as bass guitarist until 1996, when he left the band and was followed by Christian Decker.

Schäfer received six gold records for his band's albums Fury in the Slaughterhouse (1988), Mono (1992) and The Hearing and the Sense of Balance (1995). During Schäfer's time at Fury in the Slaughterhouse the band sold approximately three million records and CDs.

In 1995, Schäfer's band was awarded the comet, Germany's most important musical award, as the best rock act of the year.

In his musical career Schäfer played more than 1400 concerts with more than five million spectators. When Fury in the Slaughterhouse split, Schäfer played at their three farewell concerts in Hanover in August 2008. On 14 May 2011 Schäfer played one more Fury concert at the AWD-Arena in front of more than 40,000 spectators when Fury in the Slaughterhouse re-unified celebrating Hannover 96s qualification for the UEFA Europa League.

In 1996, Schäfer left the band to start studying medicine. After approbation, graduation, and medical specialist qualifications, he became a gynaecologist. Today (2011) he works in his own surgery in Hanover, Germany.

External links 
 Göttingen newspaper article about Schäfer's two careers (German)
 Website of Schäfer's surgery

German rock musicians
German bass guitarists
Male bass guitarists
German male singers
German gynaecologists
Musicians from Göttingen
1965 births
Living people
German male guitarists
Physicians from Göttingen